Ocean's 7 is an American musical collective composed of singer-songwriters, record producers, and rappers consisted of Jermaine Dupri, Bryan Michael-Cox, Johntá Austin, Usher, Nelly, Trey Songz, and Dupri's assistant Tyrone. The group released the mixtape 3000 And 9 Shit, on May 5, 2009. Formed by Dupri in 1989, the group was modeled after the Rat Pack in the film Ocean's 11. Like the Rat Pack, the group's initial members, Dupri, Michael-Cox, and Austin are all associates and have teamed up to write and produce various hit singles for several artists in their careers.

Often the team works together or just in a pairing. Their most notable productions are "U Got It Bad", "Burn" "Confessions Part II" by fellow member "Usher," "Be Without You" by Mary J. Blige, "Everytime tha Beat Drop", "Love All Over Me" by Monica, "Like You", "Outta My System" and "Shorty Like Mine" by Bow Wow, and "We Belong Together", "Don't Forget About Us", "It's Like That", "Shake It Off", "I Stay in Love" and "You Don't Know What to Do" for Mariah Carey.

History
The group was assembled by Jermaine Durpi. In an interview with the Boombox "As far as the name of the group it was something that we just accidentally [started] doing by hanging out and working together. Together Dupri and Michael-Cox were in Las Vegas working on the Here I Stand album for Usher and after they would record they would get dressed up often wearing Tom Ford and going to clubs. Dupri noticed restaurants began treating them differently because they were all dressed up. Dupri on his video blog Living The Life on Youtube he would record and release episodes of the group in the studio often going out on the town, being in the recording studio and other times talking about life topics. The group started as the Ocean's 5 eventually adding Nelly and Trey Songz to the group they became the Ocean's 7. A visiting member of the group included rapper Bow Wow.

Members

 Jermaine Dupri – Executive Producer, Writing Production, Rapper, Arrangement
 Johnta Austin – Executive Producer, Writing, Production, Vocals, Arrangement
 Bryan Michael-Cox – Production, Song Writing, Vocals, Arrangement
Usher – Vocals, Executive Producer, Song Writing, Arrangement 
 Trey Songz – Vocals, Song Writing
 Nelly – Rapper, Song Writing
 Tyrone – Assistant

Discography

Mixtapes

 3000 And 9 Shit (2009)

Production discography

Singles
1999: "Keys to the Range" (featuring Jermaine Dupri) by Jagged Edge
1999: "He Can't Love U" by Jagged Edge
1999: "Let's Get Married" by Jagged Edge
1999: "What'chu Like" by Da Brat
2000: Goodbye by Jagged Edge
2000: I Got it 2 by Jagged Edge
2000: "Promise" by Jagged Edge
2000: "Just Be a Man About It" by Toni Braxton
2000: "Puppy Love" by Lil' Bow Wow
2001: "U Got it Bad" by Usher
2001: "U-Turn" by Usher
2001: "Where the Party At?" by Jagged Edge
2002: "Take Ya Home" by Bow Wow
2002: Don't Mess with My Man by Nivea
2004: "Burn" by Usher
2004: "Confessions Part II" by Usher
2004: "My Boo" by Usher featuring Alicia Keys
2005: "It's Like That" by Mariah Carey
2005: "We Belong Together" by Mariah Carey
2005: "Shake It Off" by Mariah Carey
2005: "Be Without You" by Mary J. Blige
2005: "Get Your Number" by Mariah Carey
2005: "Don't Forget About Us" by Mariah Carey
2006: "Everytime The Beat Drops" by Monica 
2006: "Call on Me" by Janet Jackson featuring Nelly 
2006: "So Excited" by Janet Jackson featuring Khia 
2007: "Outta My System" by Bow Wow
2007: "Shortie Like Mine" by Bow Wow featuring Chris Brown and Johntá Austin
2007: "Put a Little Umph in It" by Jagged Edge featuring Ashanti 
2009: "I Need a Girl" by Trey Songz
2010: "Love All Over Me" by Monica
2010: "Oh Santa!" by Mariah Carey
2017: "I Don't" by Mariah Carey featuring YG
2020: "Don't Waste My Time" by Usher featuring Ella Mai
2021: "Pressure" by Ari Lennox
2022: "If I Get Caught" by Dvsn

References 

African-American musical groups
Songwriting teams
Hip hop collectives
Musical collectives
Record production teams